Bhawandesar is a village and Gram Panchayat in Churu located between municipalities Ratangarh and Rajaldesar on a road parallel to National Highway-11. It falls under Ratangarh (Rajasthan) assembly constituency of Churu Lok sabha

References 

Villages in Churu district